Qinhuai District is one of 11 districts of Nanjing, the capital of Jiangsu province, China.

Administrative subdivisions
Qinhuai has administrative jurisdiction over the following 12 subdistricts:

In 2013, Baixia merged into Qinhuai gaining seven additional subdistricts.

Important areas in Qinhuai District
 Caoqiao Mosque
 Fuzimiao
 Zhonghua Gate
 Bao'ensi

See also
Qinhuai Lantern Fair

References

External links

Official website of Qinhuai District government

Districts of Nanjing
County-level divisions of Jiangsu